Robert Wallace (born 1905) was a Scottish professional footballer who played as an inside forward for Cowdenbeath, Sunderland and Third Lanark.

References

1905 births
Footballers from Paisley, Renfrewshire
Scottish footballers
Association football inside forwards
Cambuslang Rangers F.C. players
Cowdenbeath F.C. players
Sunderland A.F.C. players
Third Lanark A.C. players
Bo'ness F.C. players
Raleigh Athletic F.C. players
English Football League players
Scottish Junior Football Association players
Scottish Football League players
Year of death missing